John Bury OBE  (27 January 1925 - 12 November 2000) was a British set, costume and lighting designer who worked for theatres in London, the rest of the UK, and Broadway and international opera.

John was educated at Hereford Cathedral School. After serving in the Royal Navy during World War II, Bury pursued a variety of jobs before joining the Theatre Workshop. After a period working for Theatre Workshop under the direction of Joan Littlewood at the Theatre Royal Stratford East in London, in 1963 he joined the Royal Shakespeare Company, whose artistic director was then Peter Hall. In 1973 he followed Hall to the National Theatre Company, then still based at the Old Vic to become its Head of Design and an associate director. For Hall's Broadway production of Amadeus by Peter Shaffer, Bury was nominated for Tony Awards for scenery, costumes and lighting, and received the award for scenery and lighting.

He was also nominated for 5 more Tony Awards including his first production on Broadway, Harold Pinter's The Homecoming in 1967 and was appointed OBE in the 1979 New Year Honours.

References

1925 births
2000 deaths
British scenic designers
Tony Award winners
Officers of the Order of the British Empire
Opera designers